The women's shot put event at the 2002 World Junior Championships in Athletics was held in Kingston, Jamaica, at National Stadium on 19 and 20 July.

Medalists

Results

Final
20 July

Qualifications
19 Jul

Group A

Participation
According to an unofficial count, 19 athletes from 16 countries participated in the event.

References

Shot put
Shot put at the World Athletics U20 Championships